Zhuolu County is a county in the northwest of Hebei province, bordering Beijing's Mentougou District to the east. It is under the administration of the Zhangjiakou city. It has eight towns, nine townships, and 373 village-level units. It is located near the confluence of the Sanggan River (桑干河) and Yang River tributaries to the Yongding River, on the banks of Sanggan River. Zhuolu has 2802 square kilometers (approximately 1082 square miles), with a population of 330,000 inhabitants. Its postal code number is 075600, and its telephone area code is 0313.

Historical uncertainty
Modern Zhuolu may or may not have been the location of the historical Battle of Zhuolu. However, it is promoted for tourism as such. Modern Zhuolu may or may not have been the location of what is claimed to be the only city founded by the legendary Yellow Emperor, Huáng dì 黄帝, although there is evidence to support this case.

Historic sites and scenic spots
Among the historic, scenic, or tourist destination spots, there are several associated with Huang di (the Yellow Emperor) and his rival Chi You. Besides this historical-type tourism, ecological tourism is also offered, although industrial plant/sector tours seem to be less widely advertised. As of June, 2009, an investment of 2,000,000 (US$) is planned to develop and promote grape and wine country tours, in the so-called "Zhuolu Grape Sightseeing Zone".

Economy
Aside from tourism, the local economy is typified by heavy manufacturing industries, together with viticulture and orchard produce, such as almonds. The Zhangjiakou vicinity is typified by iron and steel metallurgy. According to a Chinese government source, Zhuolu has the "largest grape plantation in Asia", being particularly noted for producing the Longyan grape, but also growing over twenty other varieties.

Grapes and wine
Zhuolu is considered to be part of the Huai-Zhuo Basin viticultural region, along with Xuanhua and Huailai. With a claimed heat summation of 3532 degrees Celsius and 413 mm. (approximately sixteen and one-quarter inches) of annual rainfall, a sandy, lime, loam soil, and a distinct day/night temperature, together with the cool, dry summers, Zhuolu may be quite suitable for the production of Vitis vinefera-based wines, such as Cabernet sauvignon.

Administrative divisions
Zhuolu County is subdivided into the following:

The county-administered district is Nanshan District

Towns:
Zhuolu Town, Zhangjiabu, Wujiagou, Wubu, Baodai, Fanshan, Dabu, Hedong, Dongxiaozhuang, Dahenan, Huiyao

Townships:
Luanzhuang Township, Wenquantun Township, Heishansi Township, Wofosi Township, Xiejiabu Township, Mangshikou Township

Climate

References
Sivin, Nathan, and others, ed. (1988) The Contemporary Atlas of China. Weidenfeld and Nicolson, London.

Notes

External links

Government Website (Chinese)
cultural-china.com Includes some pictures, info
Hebeitour tourist oriented

 
County-level divisions of Hebei
Zhangjiakou